Dewanganj  is a village development committee in Sunsari District in the Kosi Zone of south-eastern Nepal. At the time of the 1991 Nepal census it had a population of 4372 people living in 774 individual households. It has made many changes in the sector of transportation.

References

Populated places in Sunsari District